Dompo is an endangered language of Ghana. Speakers are shifting to Nafaanra. It is spoken adjacent to the main town of the Nafaanra people, namely Banda, Brong-Ahafo Region, Ghana. Blench (2015) reports that it is spoken by 10 households.

Classification
Dompo has numerous parallels with the Gonja language, but according to Blench (1999) does not appear to be directly related to it. Blench suggests three possibilities:
it is a Gonja dialect that has come under heavy external influence;
it is a related Guang language that has been relexified, largely from Gonja;
it is of some other source, and relexified, largely from Gonja.
None of the Dompo names for wild plants or animals resemble Gonja, suggesting that the last is the most likely. Some Dompo animal names show resemblances with Mpra. 

However, Gueldemann (2018) finds the Guang/Gonja connection to be overwhelming:

References

Sources
Blench, Roger. 1999. Recent Field Work in Ghana: Report on Dompo and a note on Mpre.
Blench, Roger. 2015. The Dompo language of Central Ghana and its affinities.

Guang languages
Languages of Ghana
Unclassified languages of Africa
Endangered unclassified languages